The 1996 Atlanta Falcons season was the franchise’s 31st season in the National Football League (NFL). The Falcons were unable to match their previous season’s output of 9–7 and failed to reach the playoffs. Atlanta started the season 0–8, going winless until November. Two of the team’s three wins were over the equally inept New Orleans Saints, who also finished 3–13.

The Falcons allowed 461 points in 1996, the most in team history. Football Outsiders calculates that the 1996 Falcons had the third-worst pass defense they had ever tracked.

The season was notable when Jeff George was engaged in a shouting match with June Jones in a nationally televised game against Philadelphia. The next day, George was suspended for his act and was eventually released by the team. As for coach Jones, he was fired at the conclusion of the season.

Offseason

NFL draft

Personnel

Staff

Roster

Regular season

Schedule

Standings

References

External links
 1996 Atlanta Falcons at Pro-Football-Reference.com

Atlanta Falcons seasons
Atlanta Falcons
Atlanta